George Enrique Herbert is a Belizean gang leader and drug trafficker who worked with Mexican and Colombian drug cartels to distribute controlled drugs in Belize and the United States. He was convicted by a jury in Manhattan federal court on December 14, 2004 on multiple cocaine importation charges. He is married and has one child.

Background and Trial
Herbert was arrested in Belize and extradited to the United States. The four-count indictment charged Herbert with conspiring with others to import tons of cocaine into the United States between March 2001 and August 2002, and with three separate instances of shipping cocaine from the waters off Belize to Mexico, with the intent or knowledge that the drugs would be transported to the United States.

According to the evidence at trial, Herbert was enlisted in March 2001 by a corrupt Belizean government official working with the Mexican Juarez Cartel to assist in the smuggling of ton-quantities of cocaine from the Atlantic coast of Colombia to Calderitas, Mexico. Herbert, assisted by armed members of a Belize City street gang, the "George Street Crew," received the one-ton-plus cocaine shipments in the waters off Belize from speedboats dispatched by high-level cocaine supplier Mauricio Ruda-Alvarez. Herbert and his associates then transported the shipments through the reefs and small islands off Belize to the port of Calderitas, Mexico. in Calderitas, Juarez  Cartel operatives, assisted by corrupt Mexican police, took custody of the cocaine and shipped it to the US.

Conviction
On December 14, 2004, the jury found Herbert guilty on three counts of manufacturing or distributing of narcotics for illegal importation under 21 USC sections 959(a), 960(b)(1)(B)(ii), and 812 and 18 USC section 2, and one count of attempt or conspiracy to import or export narcotics. The jury also found that Herbert used firearms in furtherance of the narcotics crimes, and that he managed and supervised other offenses. Each of the four counts of conviction carries a mandatory minimum sentence of 10 years imprisonment and a maximum sentence of life imprisonment. Jorge Manuel Torres Teyer and Victor Manuel Adan Carrasco, leaders of the Juarez Cartel in Belize and the Mexican state of Quintana Roo, with whom Herbert conspired, pleaded guilty in Manhattan federal court in 2003, and were sentenced in May 2004. Mauricio Ruda-Alvarez, the Colombian cocaine supplier, was found murdered in the trunk of a car in Medellín in October 2002. The evidence at trial established that two months prior, in August 2002, Ruda-Alvarez had commissioned a failed attempt to kidnap Herbert over a shipment of cocaine Herbert had stolen.

Herbert is incarcerated at the Federal Correctional Institution Victorville, at Adelanto, California, and his projected date of release is June 1, 2032.

See also

The Yogurt Connection

Notes

Living people
Belizean drug traffickers
Belizean people imprisoned abroad
Prisoners and detainees of the United States federal government
People extradited from Belize
People extradited to the United States
Year of birth missing (living people)